Pembroke Park is a town in Broward County, Florida, United States. The town took its name from its location along Pembroke Road. As of the 2020 census, the population was 6,260. It is part of the South Florida metropolitan area, which was home to 5,564,635 people at the 2010 census. Almost one-half of its residents live in mobile homes.

Geography

On its north:
Hollywood
West Park

On its northeast:
Hallandale Beach
Hollywood

On its northwest:
West Park

On its south:
Miami Gardens
Unincorporated Miami-Dade County (Ives Estates)
West Park

On its southeast:
Unincorporated Miami-Dade County (Ojus and Highland Lakes)
West Park

On its southwest:
Miami Gardens
Unincorporated Miami-Dade County (Ives Estates)
West Park

On its east:
Hallandale Beach

On its west:
West Park

Demographics

2020 census

As of the 2020 United States census, there were 6,260 people, 2,358 households, and 1,430 families residing in the town.

2010 census

As of 2010, there were 3,695 households, out of which 32.7% were vacant. In 2000, 29.5% had children under the age of 18 living with them, 31.8% were married couples living together, 21.6% had a female householder with no husband present, and 41.8% were non-families. 33.7% of all households were made up of individuals, and 15.1% had someone living alone who was 65 years of age or older. The average household size was 2.29 and the average family size was 2.96.

In 2000, the town population was spread out, with 27.0% under the age of 18, 9.0% from 18 to 24, 28.0% from 25 to 44, 18.7% from 45 to 64, and 17.4% who were 65 years of age or older. The median age was 33 years. For every 100 females, there were 85.4 males. For every 100 females age 18 and over, there were 79.3 males.

In 2000, the median income for a household in the town was $22,605, and the median income for a family was $25,972. Males had a median income of $26,275 versus $21,230 for females. The per capita income for the town was $14,369. About 20.0% of families and 24.0% of the population were below the poverty line, including 27.2% of those under age 18 and 25.5% of those age 65 or over.

As of 2000, speakers of English as a first language was at 73.87%, while Spanish accounted for 11.49%, French 10.05% (most of whom are French Canadian,) and French Creole at 4.57% of residents.

As of 2000, Pembroke Park had the sixth highest percentage of Canadian residents in the US (many of whom are French Canadians from Quebec,) with 3.1% of the populace. It was also the fifth most British West Indian populace, at 1.1% (tied with Gordon Heights, New York,) the twelfth highest percentage of Jamaican residents in the US, at 8% of the city's population, and the 137th highest percentage of Cuban residents in the US, at 1.52% of the city's population (tied with Goldenrod, Florida.) It also had the 123rd most Dominicans in the US, at 1.25% (tied with three Northeast US areas,) while it had the thirty-fourth highest percentage of Haitians (tied with South Floral Park, New York, as well as Pomona, New York and Lakeview, New York,) at 5.4% of all residents.

Education
Residents are zoned to schools in Broward County Public Schools:
 Almost all of the town is zoned to Lake Forest Elementary School, and a portion is zoned to Watkins Elementary School.
 McNichol Middle School
 Hallandale High School

References

External links
 

Pembroke Park, Florida at City-Data.com

Towns in Broward County, Florida
Towns in Florida